Jasmineae is a tribe of flowering plants in the olive family, Oleaceae.

Genera 
 Jasminum L. - Jasmines
 Menodora Humb. & Bonpl.

References 

 
Asterid tribes